Street Corner Style is the first album by the Spanish doo wop band the Earth Angels. It was released in May 2010.

A review in Record Collector magazine characterized the album as evoking Bronx and Queens street music of the early 1960s, and described the album "one of the most satisfying and credible modern doo wop collections we’ve ever heard."

Track listing

References

External links 
 

2010 albums
Doo-wop albums